Ngũgĩ wa Thiong'o (born James Ngugi; 5 January 1938) is a Kenyan author and academic who writes primarily in Gikuyu and who formerly wrote in English. He has been described as having been "considered East Africa’s leading novelist". His work includes novels, plays, short stories, and essays, ranging from literary and social criticism to children's literature. He is the founder and editor of the Gikuyu-language journal Mũtĩiri. His short story The Upright Revolution: Or Why Humans Walk Upright, is translated into 100 languages from around the world.

In 1977, Ngũgĩ embarked upon a novel form of theatre in his native Kenya that sought to liberate the theatrical process from what he held to be "the general bourgeois education system", by encouraging spontaneity and audience participation in the performances. His project sought to "demystify" the theatrical process, and to avoid the "process of alienation [that] produces a gallery of active stars and an undifferentiated mass of grateful admirers" which, according to Ngũgĩ, encourages passivity in "ordinary people". Although his landmark play, Ngaahika Ndeenda, co-written with Ngũgĩ wa Mirii, was a commercial success, it was shut down by the authoritarian Kenyan regime six weeks after its opening.

Ngũgĩ was subsequently imprisoned for over a year. Adopted as an Amnesty International prisoner of conscience, the artist was released from prison, and fled Kenya. In the United States, he is currently Distinguished Professor of Comparative Literature and English at the University of California, Irvine. He has also previously taught at Northwestern University, Yale University, and New York University. Ngũgĩ has frequently been regarded as a likely candidate for the Nobel Prize in Literature. He won the 2001 International Nonino Prize in Italy, and the 2016 Park Kyong-ni Prize. Among his children are the authors Mũkoma wa Ngũgĩ and Wanjiku wa Ngũgĩ.

Biography

Early years and education
Ngũgĩ was born in Kamiriithu, near Limuru in Kiambu district, Kenya, of Kikuyu descent, and baptised James Ngugi. His family was caught up in the Mau Mau Uprising; his half-brother Mwangi was actively involved in the Kenya Land and Freedom Army (during which he was killed), another brother was shot during the State of Emergency, and his mother was tortured at Kamiriithu home guard post.

He went to the Alliance High School, and went on to study at Makerere University College in Kampala, Uganda. As a student he attended the African Writers Conference held at Makerere in June 1962, and his play The Black Hermit premiered as part of the event at The National Theatre. At the conference Ngũgĩ asked Chinua Achebe to read the manuscripts of his novels The River Between and Weep Not, Child, which would subsequently be published in Heinemann's African Writers Series, launched in London that year, with Achebe as its first advisory editor. Ngũgĩ received his B.A. in English from Makerere University College, Uganda, in 1963.

First publications and studies in England
His debut novel, Weep Not, Child, was published in May 1964, becoming the first novel in English to be published by a writer from East Africa.

Later that year, having won a scholarship to the University of Leeds to study for an MA, Ngũgĩ travelled to England, where he was when his second novel, The River Between, came out in 1965. The River Between, which has as its background the Mau Mau Uprising, and described an unhappy romance between Christians and non-Christians, was previously on Kenya's national secondary school syllabus. He left Leeds without completing his thesis on Caribbean literature, for which his studies had focused on George Lamming, about whom Ngũgĩ said in his 1972 collection of essays Homecoming: "He evoked for me, an unforgettable picture of a peasant revolt in a white-dominated world. And suddenly I knew that a novel could be made to speak to me, could, with a compelling urgency, touch cords [sic] deep down in me. His world was not as strange to me as that of Fielding, Defoe, Smollett, Jane Austen, George Eliot, Dickens, D. H. Lawrence."

Change of name, ideology and teaching
Ngũgĩ's 1967 novel A Grain of Wheat marked his embrace of Fanonist Marxism. He subsequently renounced writing in English, and the name James Ngugi as colonialist; by 1970 he had changed his name to Ngũgĩ wa Thiong'o, and began to write in his native Gikuyu. In 1967, Ngũgĩ also began teaching at the University of Nairobi as a professor of English literature. He continued to teach at the university for ten years while serving as a Fellow in Creative Writing at Makerere. During this time, he also guest lectured at Northwestern University in the department of English and African Studies for a year.

While a professor at the University of Nairobi, Ngũgĩ was the catalyst of the discussion to abolish the English department. He argued that after the end of colonialism, it was imperative that a university in Africa teach African literature, including oral literature, and that such should be done with the realization of the richness of African languages.

Imprisonment 
In 1976, Thiong'o helped to establish The Kamiriithu Community Education and Cultural Centre which, among other things, organised African Theatre in the area. The following year saw the publication of Petals of Blood. Its strong political message, and that of his play Ngaahika Ndeenda (I Will Marry When I Want), co-written with Ngũgĩ wa Mirii and also published in 1977, provoked the then Kenyan Vice-President Daniel arap Moi to order his arrest. Along with copies of his play, books by Karl Marx, Friedrich Engels, and Vladimir Lenin were confiscated. He was sent to Kamiti Maximum Security Prison, and kept there without a trial for nearly a year.

He was imprisoned in a cell with other political prisoners. During part of their imprisonment, they were allowed one hour of sunlight a day. Ngũgĩ writes "The compound used to be for the mentally deranged convicts before it was put to better use as a cage for 'the politically deranged." He found solace in writing and wrote the first modern novel in Gikuyu, Devil on the Cross (Caitaani mũtharaba-Inĩ), on prison-issued toilet paper.

After his release in December 1978, he was not reinstated to his job as professor at Nairobi University, and his family was harassed. Due to his writing about the injustices of the dictatorial government at the time, Ngũgĩ and his family were forced to live in exile. Only after Arap Moi, the longest-serving Kenyan president, retired in 2002, was it safe for them to return.

During his time in prison, Ngũgĩ made the decision to cease writing his plays and other works in English and began writing all his creative works in his native tongue, Gikuyu.

His time in prison also inspired the play The Trial of Dedan Kimathi (1976). He wrote this in collaboration with Micere Githae Mugo.

Exile
While in exile, Ngũgĩ worked with the London-based Committee for the Release of Political Prisoners in Kenya (1982–98). Matigari ma Njiruungi (translated by Wangui wa Goro into English as Matigari) was published at this time.  In 1984, he was Visiting Professor at Bayreuth University, and the following year was Writer-in-Residence for the Borough of Islington in London. He also studied film at Dramatiska Institute in Stockholm, Sweden (1986).

His later works include Detained, his prison diary (1981), Decolonising the Mind: The Politics of Language in African Literature (1986), an essay arguing for African writers' expression in their native languages rather than European languages, in order to renounce lingering colonial ties and to build an authentic African literature, and Matigari (translated by Wangui wa Goro), (1987), one of his most famous works, a satire based on a Gikuyu folk tale.

Ngũgĩ was Visiting Professor of English and Comparative Literature at Yale University between 1989 and 1992. In 1992, he was guest at the Congress of South African Writers and spent time in Zwide Township with Mzi Mahola, the year he became a professor of Comparative Literature and Performance Studies at New York University, where he held the Erich Maria Remarque Chair. He is currently a Distinguished Professor of English and Comparative Literature as well as having been the first director of the International Center for Writing and Translation at the University of California, Irvine.

2000s

On 8 August 2004, Ngũgĩ returned to Kenya as part of a month-long tour of East Africa.  On 11 August, robbers broke into his high-security apartment: they assaulted Ngũgĩ, sexually assaulted his wife and stole various items of value. When Ngũgĩ returned to America at the end of his month trip, five men were arrested on suspicion of the crime, including Ngũgĩ's own nephew. In the summer 2006 the American publishing firm Random House published his first new novel in nearly two decades, Wizard of the Crow, translated to English from Gikuyu by the author.

On 10 November 2006, while in San Francisco at Hotel Vitale at the Embarcadero, Ngũgĩ was harassed and ordered to leave the hotel by an employee. The event led to a public outcry and angered both African-Americans and members of the African diaspora living in America, prompting an apology by the hotel.

His recent books include Globalectics: Theory and the Politics of Knowing (2012), and Something Torn and New: An African Renaissance, a collection of essays published in 2009 making the argument for the crucial role of African languages in "the resurrection of African memory", about which Publishers Weekly said: "Ngugi’s language is fresh; the questions he raises are profound, the argument he makes is clear: 'To starve or kill a language is to starve and kill a people’s memory bank.'" This was followed by two well received autobiographical works: Dreams in a Time of War: a Childhood Memoir (2010) and In the House of the Interpreter: A Memoir (2012), which was described as "brilliant and essential" by the Los Angeles Times, among other positive reviews.

His book The Perfect Nine, originally written and published in Gikuyu as  Kenda Muiyuru: Rugano Rwa Gikuyu na Mumbi (2019), was translated into English by Ngũgĩ for its 2020 publication, and is a reimagining in epic poetry of his people's origin story. It was described by the Los Angeles Times as "a quest novel-in-verse that explores folklore, myth and allegory through a decidedly feminist and pan-African lens." The review in World Literature Today said: "Ngũgĩ crafts a beautiful retelling of the Gĩkũyũ myth that emphasizes the noble pursuit of beauty, the necessity of personal courage, the importance of filial piety, and a sense of the Giver Supreme—a being who represents divinity, and unity, across world religions. All these things coalesce into dynamic verse to make The Perfect Nine a story of miracles and perseverance; a chronicle of modernity and myth; a meditation on beginnings and endings; and a palimpsest of ancient and contemporary memory, as Ngũgĩ overlays the Perfect Nine's feminine power onto the origin myth of the Gĩkũyũ people of Kenya in a moving rendition of the epic form." Fiona Sampson writing in The Guardian concluded that it is "a beautiful work of integration that not only refuses distinctions between 'high art' and traditional storytelling, but supplies that all-too rare human necessity: the sense that life has meaning."

In March 2021, The Perfect Nine became the first work written in an indigenous African language to be longlisted for the International Booker Prize, with Ngũgĩ becoming the first nominee as both the author and translator of the same book.

Family 
Four of his children are also published authors: Tee Ngũgĩ, Mũkoma wa Ngũgĩ, Nducu wa Ngũgĩ, and Wanjiku wa Ngũgĩ.

Awards and honours

1963: The East Africa Novel Prize
1964: Unesco First Prize for his novel, Weep Not Child, at the First World Festival of Black and African arts at Dakar, Senegal 
1973: The Lotus Prize for Literature, at Alma Atta, Khazakhistan
1992 (6 April): The Paul Robeson award for Artistic Excellence, Political Conscience and Integrity, in Philadelphia 
1992 (October): honoured by New York University by being appointed to the Erich Maria Remarque Professorship in Languages to "acknowledge extraordinary scholarly achievement, strong leadership in the University Community and the Profession and significant contribution to our educational mission." 
1993: The Zola Neale Hurston-Paul Robeson Award, for artistic and scholarly achievement, awarded by the National Council for Black Studies, in Accra, Ghana 
1994 (October): The Gwendolyn Brooks Center Contributors Award for significant contribution to The Black Literary Arts 
1996: The Fonlon-Nichols Prize, New York, for Artistic Excellence and Human Rights 
2001: Nonino International Prize for Literature 
2002: Zimbabwe International Book Fair, "The Best Twelve African Books of the Twentieth Century."
2002 (July): Distinguished Professor of English and Comparative Literature, UCI.
2002 (October): Medal of the Presidency of the Italian Cabinet Awarded by the International Scientific Committee of the Pio Manzu Centre, Rimini, Italy.
2003 (May): Honorary Foreign Member of the American Academy of Arts and Letters.
2003 (December): Honorary Life Membership of the Council for the Development of Social Science Research in Africa (CODESRIA),
2004 (23–28 February): Visiting Fellow, Humanities Research Centre.
2006: Wizard of the Crow is No. 3 on Time magazine's Top 10 Books of the Year (European edition)
2006: Wizard of the Crow is one of The Economists Best Books of the Year
2006: Wizard of the Crow is one of Salon.coms picks for Best Fiction of the year
2006: Wizard of the Crow is the winner of the Winter 2007 Read This! for Lit-Blog Co-Op; The Literary Saloon
2006: Wizard of the Crow highlighted in the Washington Post’s Favorite Books of the year.
2007: Wizard of the Crow - Finalist on the Long List for the 2007 Independent Foreign Fiction Prize.
2007: Wizard of the Crow - Finalist on the NAACP Image Award for Fiction
2007: Wizard of the Crow - finalist on the 2007 Commonwealth Writers' Prize Shortlist for Best Book – Africa.
2007: Wizard of the Crow - Gold medal winner in Fiction for the 2007 California Book Awards
2007: Wizard of the Crow - 2007 Aspen Prize for Literature
2007: Wizard of the Crow – Finalist for the 2007 Hurston/Wright Legacy Award for Black Literature
2008: Wizard of the Crow nominated for the 2008 IMPAC Dublin Award
2008 (2 April): Order of the Elder of Burning Spear (Kenya Medal – conferred by Kenya’s Ambassador to the United States in Los Angeles).
2008: (October, 24) Grinzane for Africa Award
2008: Dan and Maggie Inouye Distinguished Chair in Democratic Ideals, University of Hawaiʻi at Mānoa.
2009: Shortlisted for the Man Booker International Prize
2011: (17 February) Africa Channel Literary Achievement Award.
2012: National Book Critics Circle Award (finalist Autobiography) for In the House of the Interpreter
2012 (31 March): W.E.B. Du Bois Award, National Black Writer’s Conference, New York.
2013 (October): UCI Medal
2014: Elected to American Academy of Arts and Sciences
2014: Nicolás Guillén Lifetime Achievement Award for Philosophical Literature
2014 (16 November): Honoured at Archipelago Books' 10th anniversary gala in New York.
2016: Park Kyong-ni Prize
2016 (14 December): Sanaa Theatre Awards/Lifetime Achievement Award in recognition of excellence in Kenyan Theatre, Kenya National Theatre.
2017: Los Angeles Review of Books/UCR Creative Writing Lifetime Achievement Award
2018: Grand Prix des mécènes of the GPLA 2018, for his entire body of work.
2019: Premi Internacional de Catalunya Award for his Courageous work and Advocacy for African languages
2021: Shortlisted for the International Booker Prize for The Perfect Nine
2021: Elected a Royal Society of Literature International Writer
2022: PEN/Nabokov Award for Achievement in International Literature

Honorary degrees
Albright College, Doctor of Humane Letters honoris causa, 1994 
University of Leeds, Honorary doctorate of Letters (LittD), 2004
Walter Sisulu University (formerly U. Transkei), South Africa, Honorary Degree, Doctor of Literature and Philosophy, July 2004. 
California State University, Dominguez Hills, Honorary Degree, Doctor of Humane Letters, May 2005. 
Dillard University, New Orleans, Honorary Degree, Doctor of Humane Letters, May 2005.  
University of Auckland, Honorary doctorate of Letters (LittD), 2005 
New York University, Honorary Degree, Doctor of Letters, 15 May 2008
University of Dar es Salaam, Honorary doctorate in Literature, 2013
University of Bayreuth, Honorary doctorate (Dr. phil. h.c.), 2014
KCA University, Kenya, Honorary Doctorate degree of Human Letters (honoris causa) in Education, 27 November 2016 
Yale University, Honorary doctorate (D.Litt. h.c.), 2017
University of Edinburgh, Honorary doctorate (D.Litt.), 2019
Honorary PhD, Roskilde, Denmark

Publications

Novels

 Weep Not, Child (1964), 
 The River Between (1965), 
 A Grain of Wheat (1967, 1992), 
 Petals of Blood (1977), 
 Caitaani Mutharaba-Ini (Devil on the Cross, 1980)
 Matigari ma Njiruungi, 1986 (Matigari, translated into English by Wangui wa Goro, 1989), 
 Mũrogi wa Kagogo (Wizard of the Crow, 2004), 
 The Perfect Nine: The Epic of Gĩkũyũ and Mũmbi (2020)

Short story collections
 meeting in the Dark (1974)
 Secret Lives, and Other Stories, (1976, 1992), 
 Minutes of Glory and Other Stories (2019)

Plays
 The Black Hermit (1963)
 This Time Tomorrow (three plays, including the title play, "The Rebels", "The Wound in the Heart" and "This Time Tomorrow") (c. 1970)
 Homecoming: Essays on African and Caribbean Literature, Culture, and Politics (1972), 
 The Trial of Dedan Kimathi (1976), African Publishing Group,  (with Micere Githae Mugo and Njaka)
 Ngaahika Ndeenda: Ithaako ria ngerekano (I Will Marry When I Want) (1977, 1982) (with Ngũgĩ wa Mirii)

Memoirs
 Detained: A Writer's Prison Diary (1981)
 Dreams in a Time of War: a Childhood Memoir (2010), 
 In the House of the Interpreter: A Memoir (2012), 
 Birth of a Dream Weaver: A Memoir of a Writer's Awakening (2016), 
 Wrestling with the devil: A Prison Memoir (2018)

Other nonfiction
 Education for a National Culture (1981)
 Barrel of a Pen: Resistance to Repression in Neo-Colonial Kenya (1983)
 Mother, Sing For Me (1986)
 Writing against Neo-Colonialism (1986)
 Decolonising the Mind: The Politics of Language in African Literature (1986), 
 Moving the Centre: The Struggle for Cultural Freedoms (1993), 
 Penpoints, Gunpoints and Dreams: The Performance of Literature and Power in Post-Colonial Africa (The Clarendon Lectures in English Literature 1996), Oxford University Press, 1998, 
 Something Torn and New: An African Renaissance (2009), 
 Globalectics: Theory and the Politics of Knowing (2012),  Globalectics: Theory and the Politics of Knowing on JSTOR
 Secure the Base: Making Africa Visible in the Globe (2016),

Children's books
 Njamba Nene and the Flying Bus (translated by Wangui wa Goro) (Njamba Nene na Mbaathi i Mathagu, 1986)
 Njamba Nene and the Cruel Chief (translated by Wangui wa Goro) (Njamba Nene na Chibu King'ang'i, 1988)
 Njamba Nene's Pistol (Bathitoora ya Njamba Nene, 1990), 
 The Upright Revolution, Or Why Humans Walk Upright, Seagull Press, 2019,

See also
 Kenyan literature
 21st century in literature
 World literature

References

Further reading
Toh, Zorobi Philippe. “Linguistic Mystifications in Discourse: Case of Proverbs in Ngugi wa Thiong’o’s Matigari”. Imaginaire et représentations socioculturelles dans les proverbes africains, edited by Lèfara Silué and Paul Samsia, Paris: L’Harmattan, 2020, pp. 63-71.
Wise, Christopher. 1997. "Resurrecting the Devil: Notes on Ngũgĩ's Theory of the Oral-Aural African Novel." Research in African Literatures 28.1:134–140.

External links

Leonard Lopate, "Writing in Exile", 12 September 2006. Interview with Ngũgĩ wa Thiongo on The Leonard Lopate Show, WNYC, New York public radio, following publication of Wizard of the Crow.
 
Ngũgĩ wa Thiong'o – Overview
biography and booklist
The Language of Scholarship in Africa, 2012 lecture by Ngũgĩ wa Thiong’o, published in Leeds African Studies Bulletin 74 (December 2012), pp. 42–47. 
'Publishing Ngũgĩ' by James Currey, in Leeds African Studies Bulletin 68 (May 2006), pp. 26–54.

1938 births
Living people
Kenyan philosophers
Alumni of the University of Leeds
Amnesty International prisoners of conscience held by Kenya
Academic staff of the University of Nairobi
Kenyan dramatists and playwrights
Kenyan essayists
Kenyan novelists
Kenyan prisoners and detainees
Kikuyu people
Makerere University alumni
People from Kiambu County
University of California, Irvine faculty
20th-century dramatists and playwrights
20th-century novelists
21st-century dramatists and playwrights
21st-century novelists
20th-century memoirists
20th-century essayists
21st-century essayists
Kenyan emigrants to the United States
20th-century male writers
21st-century male writers
Dramatiska Institutet alumni
Kikuyu-language writers
Kenyan expatriates in Uganda
Kenyan expatriates in the United Kingdom